Sergio Hudson is an American fashion designer.

Biography 
Hudson was born and brought up in Ridgeway, South Carolina. His sister was a model. He studied fashion at Bauder College.

In 2013, Hudson won Bravo TV's "Styled to Rock" fashion competition show. The $100,000 prize allow him to launch his eponymous label the following year.

The designer made his New York Fashion Week debut in September 2020. For his Spring/Summer 2022 collection, he collaborated with a number of veteran models including Beverly Johnson and Veronica Webb.

He is best known for dressing Vice President Kamala Harris and Michelle Obama during the 2021 US presidential inauguration proceeding, with both outfits making headlines, although it wasn't the first time Michella Obama donned his clothes. He has also dressed a number of celebrities including Beyoncé, Rihanna, Jennifer Lopez, Tiffany Haddish, and Issa Rae.

His ready-to-wear brand has since been picked up by numerous luxury fashion retailers including Bergdorf Goodman and Neiman Marcus.

Collections 

 Fall/Winter 2021 Ready-To-Wear
 Spring/Summer 2022 Ready-To-Wear
 Fall/Winter Ready-To-Wear 2022

References 

American fashion designers
Living people
Year of birth missing (living people)
People from Ridgeway, South Carolina